Anatoma africanae is a species of minute sea snail, a marine gastropod mollusk or micromollusk in the family Anatomidae.

References

External links
 To Encyclopedia of Life
 To World Register of Marine Species

Anatomidae
Gastropods described in 1963